"Downtown" is the first single from Peaches' third album Impeach My Bush. "Downtown" was the "Single of the Week" on XFM and chosen by NME as their choice single.  The single is also Peaches' third to chart on the UK Singles Chart.

Critical reception
NME described the song as "not an earth-stopping departure," when compared to her former songs but praised it for sounding "like a giant robot cat spewing up sound like an invitation to some kind of all-night New Orleans dwarf sex coke rave."

Music video
The video for "Downtown" was made to promote the first single from Impeach My Bush. In the video Peaches plays two characters, a woman in a red dress (probably a sex worker) and a man. Both of them interact in the video. In the end Peaches the man seems dead or passed out while androgynous Peaches cleans her face in front of a mirror.

Track listings
 "Downtown" – 3:34
 "Hanky Code" – 4:03
 "Downtown" (Simian Mobile Disco Remix) – 6:22

Song usage
"Downtown" was used in the video game The Sopranos: Road to Respect in 2006.

Charts

References

2006 singles
2006 songs
Peaches (musician) songs
Song recordings produced by Greg Kurstin
Song recordings produced by Peaches (musician)
Songs written by Peaches (musician)
XL Recordings singles